Dhaka Water Supply and Sewerage Authority is a Bangladesh government agency under the Ministry of Local Government, Rural Development and Co-operatives responsible for water and sewage in Dhaka, the capital of Bangladesh, and Narayanganj. Taqsem A. Khan is the managing director of Dhaka WASA since 2009.

History
Dhaka WASA was established in 1963 as an independent agency with the responsibility to supply water and sewage to Dhaka. It also became responsible of water and sewage Narayanganj in 1990. In 1996 it was made into an autonomous for-profit body with the passage of WASA Act. On 16 March 2019, Parliamentary Standing Committee on Estimate recommended that the government of Bangladesh split Dhaka WASA into two different bodies along North and South Dhaka.

Criticism
In a 2019 reportTransparency International Bangladesh reported that Dhaka WASA had "Rampant graft" and provided "poor service". In four out of ten zones of WASA, it was supplying water contaminated with harmful bacteria. According to a WASA report submitted to Bangladesh High Court, Dhaka WASA was supplying polluted water to 57 areas of Dhaka. Moreover, appointment of Wasa Managing Director Taqsem A Khan has been appointed as the MD for sixth consecutive terms of varying lengths, which create huge controversy despite widespread allegations of failure to provide safe water and improve waterlogging. 

In October 2022, Dhaka WASA denied all allegation of corruption and asked for evidence. The Managing Director, Taqsem A. Khan, had been sued on charges of embezzling money from the employees fund. Anti Corruption Commission launched an investigation against Taqsem A. Khan.

Board of directors

References

1963 establishments in East Pakistan
Organisations based in Dhaka
Government agencies of Bangladesh
Water management authorities in Bangladesh